The 1981–82 Toronto Maple Leafs season was the Toronto Maple Leafs 65th season of the franchise, 55th season as the Maple Leafs. The Maple Leafs missed the playoffs for the first time since 1973.

Offseason

NHL Draft

Regular season

Final standings

Schedule and results

Player statistics

Regular season
Scoring

Goaltending

Transactions
The Maple Leafs have been involved in the following transactions during the 1981-82 season.

Trades

Waivers

Free agents

Playoffs
After qualifying for the playoffs for eight consecutive seasons, this season saw the Maple Leafs miss the playoffs for the first time since the 1972-73 season.

Awards and honors

References
 Maple Leafs on Hockey Database

Toronto Maple Leafs seasons
Toronto Maple Leafs season, 1981-82
Toronto